Do Abi-ye Olya (also Romanized as Do Ābī-ye ‘Olyā; also known as Do Ābī-ye Bālā) is a village in Miankuh Rural District, Chapeshlu District, Dargaz County, Razavi Khorasan Province, Iran. At the 2006 census, its population was 197, in 43 families.

References 

Populated places in Dargaz County